Daniel Hannigan may refer to:

Daniel Hannigan, character in A Family Torn Apart
Daniel Hannigan, character in Annie (1982 film)